The High Commissioner or Governor of Northern Nigeria, originally the High Commissioner of the Northern Nigeria Protectorate, after 1914 the Lieutenant Governor, Chief Commissioner, or Governor General of the Northern Provinces of Nigeria, was effectively the viceroy of Northern Nigeria, exercising British suzerainty as representative of the Crown. The office of High Commissioner was first established on 1 January 1897, by letters patent from Queen Victoria, and after the departure of the British in 1960 it was continued until 1967 as representative of the new administration in Lagos.

With effect from 27 May 1967, Northern Nigeria was divided into the North-Eastern State, North-Western State, Kano State, Kaduna State, Kwara State, and the Benue-Plateau State, each with its own Governor.

Governors

References

See also
States of Nigeria

External links
 Constitution of the Federal Republic of Nigeria - 1999
 Interactive Map of Nigeria

Governors and Governors-General of Nigeria
Politics of Northern Nigeria